Matthias Flach (born 30 September 1982, in Rostock) is a German rower.

References 
 
 

1982 births
Living people
Rowers from Rostock
Olympic rowers of Germany
Rowers at the 2008 Summer Olympics
World Rowing Championships medalists for Germany
German male rowers